Frente Amplio may refer to:

 Broad Front (Chile), a political coalition in Chile
 Broad Front (Costa Rica), a political party in Costa Rica
 Broad Front (Dominican Republic), a political coalition in the Dominican Republic
 Broad Front (Peru), a political coalition in Peru
 Broad Front (Uruguay), a Uruguayan left-wing coalition of political parties
 Broad Progressive Front (Argentina), a political coalition in Argentina (2011–2013)
 Broad Front UNEN, a political coalition in Argentina (2013–2015)
 Broad Progressive Front, a political coalition in Mexico
 Broad Popular Front, a political party in Panama
 Broad Front for Democracy, a former political party in Panama